The Newmark-beta method is a method of numerical integration used to solve certain differential equations.  It is widely used in numerical evaluation of the dynamic response of structures and solids such as in  finite element analysis to model dynamic systems. The method is named after Nathan M. Newmark, former Professor of Civil Engineering at the University of Illinois at Urbana–Champaign, who developed it in 1959 for use in structural dynamics. The semi-discretized structural equation is a second order ordinary differential equation system,

Using the extended mean value theorem, the Newmark- method states that the first time derivative (velocity in the equation of motion) can be solved as,

where

therefore

Because acceleration also varies with time, however, the extended mean value theorem must also be extended to the second time derivative to obtain the correct displacement.  Thus,

where again

The discretized structural equation becomes

Explicit central difference scheme is obtained by setting  and 

Average constant acceleration (Middle point rule) is obtained by setting  and

Stability Analysis 
A time-integration scheme is said to be stable if there exists an integration time-step   so that for any , a finite variation of the state vector  at time  induces only a non-increasing variation of the state-vector  calculated at a subsequent time . Assume the time-integration scheme is 

For the linear structural equation 

here  is the stiffness matrix.

For undamped case, the update matrix can be decoupled by introducing the eigenmodes  of the structural system, which are solved by the generalized eigenvalue problem

For each eigenmode, the update matrix becomes

The characteristic equation of the update matrix is 

As for the stability,  we have 

Explicit central difference scheme ( and ) is stable when .

Average constant acceleration (Middle point rule) ( and ) is unconditionally stable.

References

Numerical differential equations